"Get To You" is a song by British singer James Morrison, released on 16 November 2009 as the fifth overall single from the deluxe edition of his second studio album, Songs for You, Truths for Me. Despite the song peaking at number 104 on the UK Singles Chart, and having moderate success around the world, it was only released as a single in certain areas of Europe. The music video focuses on a couple who are trying to escape from a 'web of intrigue', where James is sitting in a square, observing at all times. When their partner arrives, they manage to escape from Morrison, who is chasing. The music video for the song premiered on Morrison's YouTube channel on 23 December 2009.

Track listing

Chart performance

References

2009 singles
James Morrison (singer) songs
Songs written by James Morrison (singer)
Rock ballads
Song recordings produced by Mark Taylor (record producer)
2008 songs
Songs written by Nina Woodford
Songs written by Fraser T. Smith
Polydor Records singles